Paul John Slater (born 22 March 1958) is a retired Anglican bishop. From 2018 until January 2022, he was the Bishop of Kirkstall, a suffragan bishop in the Diocese of Leeds. He was Archdeacon of Craven from 2005 to April 2014, Archdeacon of Richmond and Craven from April 2014 to July 2015, and Bishop of Richmond from 2015 until his title (but not role) changed in 2018.

Early life
Slater was born on 22 March 1958. He was educated at Bradford Grammar School, then a direct grant grammar school in Bradford, Yorkshire. He studied chemistry at Corpus Christi College, Oxford and graduated with a Bachelor of Arts (BA) degree; this was promoted to an Oxford Master of Arts (MA Oxon) degree in 1983. In 1981, he entered Cranmer Hall (part of St John's College, Durham) to study for ordination. He graduated from Durham University with a BA degree in theology in 1983 and completed a further year of training for ministry at Cranmer Hall.

Ordained ministry
He was ordained in the Anglican ministry as a deacon in 1984 and a priest in 1985. From 1984 to 1988, he served his curacy at St Andrews's, Keighley, in the Diocese of Bradford. He was then Priest in charge of St John the Evangelist, Cullingworth and Director of the Diocesan Foundation Course between 1988 and 1993. He then became the Bishop of Bradford's Personal Executive Assistant from 1993 to 1995 and was also Warden of Readers from 1992 to 1996. He served as the Rector of St Michael and All Angels Church, Haworth from 1995 to 2001, and then the Bishop's Officer for Ministry and Mission from 2001 to 2005.

He was appointed the Archdeacon of Craven in 2005 and the acting Archdeacon of Richmond on 2 February 2014, before becoming the Archdeacon of Richmond and Craven when the two posts were merged on 20 April 2014. His residence was Kadugli House, Keighley.

Episcopal ministry
On 18 June 2015, it was announced that Slater was to be the next Bishop of Richmond, a suffragan bishop in the Diocese of Leeds. The bishopric of Richmond had been in abeyance since 1921. He was consecrated during a service at Ripon Cathedral on 19 July by John Sentamu, Archbishop of York. This was the first consecration to take place in Ripon Cathedral since that of Thomas de Kirkcudbright as Bishop of Galloway in 1293.

On 14 March 2018, Slater's See was translated from Richmond to Kirkstall (in Leeds) by Order in Council; so, keeping the same role, he became Bishop of Kirkstall.

In October 2021, it was announced that Slater would retire from the post on 31 January 2022.

Personal life
Slater is married to Beverley who works in the National Health Service. Together, they have two adult sons.

References

1958 births
Living people
Archdeacons of Craven
Archdeacons of Richmond
Anglican bishops of Richmond
Bishops of Kirkstall
20th-century English Anglican priests
21st-century English Anglican priests
Alumni of Christ Church, Oxford
People educated at Bradford Grammar School
Alumni of Cranmer Hall, Durham